Yiorgos Depollas (born Athens 1947) is a Greek photographer. Alternative spellings of his name are Giorgos Depollas and George Depollas.

Depollas was one of the main figures of the New Greek Photography movement which promoted creative photography in Greece during the 1980s and 1990s, and he remains a highly influential presence. He has been active in both creative and professional photography since 1975, and has exhibited in Greece and abroad, including Britain, France, Italy, Germany and the USA. He was one of the five founders of the Photography Centre of Athens (PCA) in 1979. The PCA was the first Greek institution devoted to creative photography, and as such a seminal focus for photographers of next generations.

Chronology
1947 - Born May 28, Athens, Greece.
1966 - 1969 - Film studies,.
1974 - Assistant director in film and television.
1975 to date - Founds Image Studio (advertising and travel photography).          
1979 - 2005 - Co-founder of the Photography Centre of Athens.
1981 - Secretary general of Greek Union of Commercial and Creative Photography.
1983 to date - Co-founder of Editions FOTORAMA.
1984 to date - Teaches photography at VAKALO school of graphic arts.
2003 to date - Founds fotoview (image bank of travel photography).

Books

Creative photography
YIORGOS DEPOLLAS  Photographs  1975 - 1995 . (trilingual, Greek - English - French), UNIVERSITY STUDIO PRESS.
ON THE BEACH. . (bilingual, Greek - English), FOTORAMA.
13 STRANGE DEATHS. . (bilingual, Greek - English), FOTORAMA.
INLOOK  George DePolla, (collectors edition).
ASYLUM.  (bilingual, Greek - English), FOTORAMA.

Travel photography
AEGEAN  VOYAGE. , FOTORAMA.
 REISE IN DIE ÄGÄIS. , FOTORAMA.
A GREEK JOURNEY. . (bilingual, Greek - English), FOTORAMA.
RETURN TO ARCADIA.  (bilingual, Greek - English), FOTORAMA.
GREECE - Wandering through time. . (bilingual, Greek - English), FOTORAMA.
ICARIA. . (bilingual, Greek - English), FOTORAMA.

Awards
1984 PRIX PHOTO’ 84 - Air France.
1995 Prize of the best exhibition (shared with Gianni Berengo Gardin) 9th Foto Synkyria, Thessaloniki (GR).
2003 Award “ΜYLOS” 2003 for the best Greek Photographic book of the year for his monograph “On the beach”, Kythera Photographic Encounters.

References

1947 births
Living people
Artists from Athens
Greek photographers